NGC 3172 (also known as Polarissima Borealis) is a lenticular galaxy located in the constellation Ursa Minor. It is the closest NGC object to the north celestial pole. Discovered by John Herschel in 1831, it is about 285 million light-years away and about 85 thousand light-years across.

A Type Ia supernova, SN 2010af, was discovered in NGC 3172 in March, 2010.

See also
 NGC 2573 - the closest NGC object to the south celestial pole.

References

External links
 SIMBAD: NGC 3054 -- Galaxy
 

Lenticular galaxies
Ursa Minor (constellation)
3172
036847